Rosamund Illing is an English Australian soprano.  Together with Richard Bonynge and the  Australian Opera and Ballet Orchestra Illing was nominated for the 2000 ARIA Award for Best Classical Album for the album Amoureuse: Sacred and Profane Arias.

Discography

Albums

Awards and nominations

ARIA Music Awards
The ARIA Music Awards is an annual awards ceremony that recognises excellence, innovation, and achievement across all genres of Australian music. They commenced in 1987. 

! 
|-
| 2000
| Amoureuse: Sacred and Profane Arias (with Richard Bonynge and Australian Opera and Ballet Orchestra)
| Best Classical Album
| 
| 
|-

References

External links
Rosamund Illing
"[biographical%20cuttings%20rosamund%20illing%20containing%20one%20more%20cuttings%20from%20newspapers%20journals]"&offset=1&max=1 Biographical cuttings on Rosamund Illing, containing one or more cuttings from newspapers or journals at the National Library of Australia.

Living people
Australian musicians
Year of birth missing (living people)